Sunset Cove is a resort village in the Canadian province of Saskatchewan within Census Division No. 6. It is on the shores of Last Mountain Lake in the Rural Municipality of McKillop No. 220.

History 
Sunset Cove incorporated as a resort village on January 1, 1983.

Demographics 

Government 
The Resort Village of Sunset Cove is governed by an elected municipal council and an appointed administrator. The mayor is Tom Fulcher and its administrator is Barbara Griffin.

See also 
List of communities in Saskatchewan
List of municipalities in Saskatchewan
List of resort villages in Saskatchewan
List of villages in Saskatchewan
List of summer villages in Alberta

References 

Resort villages in Saskatchewan
McKillop No. 220, Saskatchewan
Division No. 6, Saskatchewan